Alta Gracia is a city in Córdoba Province, Argentina.

Alta Gracia may also refer to:

Altagracia, a municipality in Rivas department, Nicaragua
La Altagracia Province, Dominican Republic
"Alta Gracia" (song), by Oscar Harris
Alta Gracia Apparel

See also 
Altagracia Mambrú